Angur Ada (literally: "Grape Base" in Pashto) is a town in the Barmal Valley, straddling the border between the South Waziristan of Pakistan's Khyber Pakhtunkhwa and Afghanistan's Paktika Province (Barmal District). It is one of the few easy passages across this mountainous border, and one of two between Paktika and Waziristan, the other passage being the Gomal River.

The Afghan village Shkin lies just to the west of Angur Ada. The actual authoritative Durand Line, first demarcated in 1895, slices through the east side of the main bazaar area, placing most of the built up area legally in Afghanistan.  However, the military forces and gates enforcing border control are several hundred meters west of the boundary and thus west of the main bazaar area, placing nearly all of the village's built-up area under the control of forces in Pakistan.

The population in the area is Pashtun, predominantly from the Wazir and Kharoti  tribes. In 2003 it was reported that eight people had been gunned down in Angur Ada, suspected of being US informants.

Angur Ada in the War on Terror
In 2003 the hunt for Osama bin Laden was said by U.S. officials to be narrowed to a  section of South Waziristan, namely the area covering the towns Angur Ada and Wana.

The 2008 Angur Ada raid

On  September 3, 2008, a raid was conducted by a US military force on Angur Ada in which 20 civilians, including at least 3 women and 4 children, were killed. This is not the first time Afghan based US troops cross the Afghan-Pakistani border in pursuit of enemy fighters, but was the first to be widely reported.

Pakistan hands over border crossing to Afghan forces
Pakistan on May 21, 2016, handed over a purpose-build border crossing facility at Angoor Ada to Afghan authorities. “With aim to strengthen brotherly relations with Afghanistan besides strategic intent to improve border management, the border-crossing facility was handed over to Afghan authorities at Angoor Ada, a buffering town,” the director general of Inter-Services Public Relations (ISPR), Lt. Gen. Asim Bajwa, tweeted. However, on June 12, 2016, Adviser to Prime Minister on Foreign Affairs Sartaj Aziz said that the check post was not given to the Afghan authorities but it was an old check post which had been constructed during Taliban era when the border control was not that stringent and the check post was on Pakistani soil while the gate was in Afghan territory, Afghan authorities were protesting for years, so Pakistan Army handed over the gate to them.

On June 7, a petition was filed in the Lahore High Court (LHC) against the handing over of Pakistani border post to Afghan Authorities stating that such an act is punishable under Section 24 of the Pakistan Army Act (PAA) 1952.

See also
 Paktika Province

References

Populated places in South Waziristan
Populated places in Paktika Province
Waziristan
Afghanistan–Pakistan border crossings